Daniel David Palmer (March 7, 1845 – October 20, 1913) was a Canadian American chiropractor who was the founder of chiropractic. Palmer was born in Pickering, Ontario, but emigrated to the United States in 1865. He was also an avid proponent of various other forms of pseudoscientific alternative medicine such as magnetic healing. Palmer opposed anything he thought to be associated with mainstream medicine such as vaccination.

Palmer believed that the human body had an ample supply of natural healing power transmitted through the nervous system. He suggested that if any one organ was affected by an illness, it merely must not be receiving its normal "nerve supply" which he dubbed a "spinal misalignment", or subluxation. He saw chiropractic as a form of realigning to reestablish the supply.

Early life 
Palmer was born in the hamlet of Brown's Corners (later Audley) of Pickering Township, in what is now Ajax, Ontario. His parents were Thomas Palmer and Katherine McVay, and his great-great-grandparents were from the United States. He received formal education until the age of 11 years, at the Audley School, and was subsequently raised in Port Perry.

At age twenty he moved to the United States with his family. Palmer held various jobs such as a beekeeper, school teacher, and grocery store owner, and had an interest in the various health philosophies of his day, including magnetic healing, and spiritualism. In 1870 Palmer was probably a student of metaphysics. Palmer practiced magnetic healing beginning in the mid-1880s in Burlington and Davenport, Iowa.

Founding of chiropractic

In 1895, Palmer was practicing magnetic healing from an office in Davenport when he encountered the building's janitor, Harvey Lillard. Lillard's hearing was severely impaired, and Palmer theorized that a palpable lump in his back that Palmer had noticed was related to Lillard's hearing deficits. Palmer then treated Lillard's back and claimed to have successfully restored his hearing, a claim which was influential in chiropractic history.

This account of how the first adjustment came to be would later be countered by Harvey's daughter who recounts a different interaction between the two men, as told to her by her father. She claims that Palmer overheard Harvey telling a joke just outside his office, and joined the group to catch the end of it. Upon hearing the punchline, Palmer heartily slapped Lillard on the back. A few days later Lillard remarked that his hearing had improved since the incident, inspiring Palmer to pursue vertebral treatment as a means to cure disease.

In 1896, D.D. Palmer's first descriptions and underlying philosophy of chiropractic was strikingly similar to Andrew Still's principles of osteopathy established a decade earlier. Both described the body as a "machine" whose parts could be manipulated to produce a drugless cure. Both professed the use of spinal manipulation on joint dysfunction to improve health; chiropractors dubbed this manipulable lesion "subluxation" which interfered with the nervous system whereas osteopaths dubbed the spinal lesion "somatic dysfunction" which affected the circulatory system. Palmer drew further distinctions by noting that he was the first to use short-lever manipulative techniques using the spinous process and transverse processes as mechanical levers to spinal dysfunction/subluxation. Soon after, osteopaths began an American wide campaign proclaimed that chiropractic was a bastardized form of osteopathy and sought licensure to differentiate the two groups. Although Palmer initially denied being trained by osteopathic medicine founder A.T. Still, in 1899 he wrote:

His theories revolved around the concept that altered nerve flow was the cause of all disease, and that misaligned spinal vertebrae had an effect on the nerve flow. He postulated that restoring these vertebrae to their proper alignment would restore health.

Spread of chiropractic 
Palmer began teaching others his new treatment methods. In 1897, he founded the Palmer School and Cure in Davenport, later renamed Palmer College of Chiropractic. Among Palmer's early students was his son B.J. Palmer. 

In 1906, Palmer was prosecuted under the new medical arts law in Iowa for practicing medicine without a license, and chose to go to jail instead of paying the fine. As a result, he spent 17 days in jail, but then elected to pay the fine. Shortly thereafter, he sold the school of chiropractic to B.J. Palmer. After the sale of the school was finalized, D.D. Palmer went to the west coast of the United States, where he helped to found chiropractic schools in Oklahoma, California, and Oregon.

Palmer's beliefs

Spiritualism

As an active spiritist, D.D. Palmer said he "received chiropractic from the other world" from a deceased medical physician named Dr. Jim Atkinson.

According to his son, B.J. Palmer, "Father often attended the annual Mississippi Valley Spiritualists Camp Meeting where he first claimed to receive messages from Dr. Jim Atkinson on the principles of chiropractic."

He regarded chiropractic as partly religious in nature. At various times he wrote:

He distanced himself from actually renaming the profession to the "religion of chiropractic" and discussed the differences between a formal, objective religion and a personal, subjective ethical religious belief. (p. 6)

Magnetic healer

Like other drugless healers of the era, Palmer practised as a magnetic healer prior to founding chiropractic. Palmer sought to combine magnetic, scientific and vitalistic viewpoints as a drugless healer.

He met opposition throughout his life, including locally, and was accused of being a crank and a quack. An 1894 edition of the local paper, the Davenport Leader, wrote:

Anti-vaccination

Like his son, Palmer was against vaccines:

Quotes 

 Disease: "The kind of dis-ease depends upon what nerves are too tense or too slack."
 Chiropractic for intellectual abnormalities: "Chiropractors correct abnormalities of the intellect as well as those of the body."'
 Life and religion: "I have answered the time-worn question — what is life?": "The dualistic system — spirit and body — united by intellectual life — the soul — is the basis of this science of biology"
 "There can be no healing without Teaching ..."
 "There is a vast difference between treating effects and adjusting the causes."

Personal life 

Palmer was married six times.

1. Abba Lord, m. 1871

2. Louvenia Landers, m. 1874 - d. 1884

3. Lavinia McGee, m. 1876 - d. 1885

4. Martha A. Henning, m. 1885

5. Villa Amanda Thomas, m. 1888 - d. 1905

6. Molly Hudler ("Mary"), m. 1906

Death 

The relationship with his son, B. J. Palmer, was tenuous and often bitter, especially after the sale of his school. Their subsequent disagreements regarding the direction of the emerging field of chiropractic were evident in D. D. Palmer's writings.  B.J. Palmer resented his father for the way he treated his family, stating that his father beat three of his children with straps and was so much involved in chiropractic that "he hardly knew he had any children". Even the circumstances surrounding his death were postulated to be attributable to B. J. 

Court records reflect that during a parade in Davenport in August 1913, D. D. was marching on foot when he was struck from behind by a car driven by B. J. He died in Los Angeles, California, on October 20, 1913. The official cause of death was typhoid fever, though some believe it was the consequence of his injuries. The courts exonerated B.J. of any responsibility for his father's death.

Chiropractic historian Joseph C. Keating, Jr. has described the attempted patricide of D. D. Palmer as a "myth" and "absurd on its face" and cites an eyewitness who recalled that D.D. was not struck by B. J.'s car but rather had stumbled. He also says that "Joy Loban, DC, executor of D.D.'s estate, voluntarily withdrew a civil suit claiming damages against B.J. Palmer, and that several grand juries repeatedly refused to bring criminal charges against the son."

References

External links 
 Chiropractic History Archives: D.D. Palmer
 D.D. Palmer's Lifeline

1845 births
1913 deaths
American chiropractors
American spiritualists
American anti-vaccination activists
Canadian chiropractors
Pre-Confederation Canadian emigrants to the United States
Canadian spiritualists
Germ theory denialists
People from Davenport, Iowa
People from Scugog
Pre-Confederation Ontario people
Persons of National Historic Significance (Canada)